Arun Kumar Sagar is an Indian politician who has been a Member of Lok Sabha for Shahjahanpur since 2019.

Political career
Arun Kumar Sagar,BJP MP from Shahjahanpur, was earlier a Bahujan Samaj Party BSP's popular youth Dalit leader of Jatav Cummunity in wesrtern UP. He was four times District President of Shahjahanpur District and two times bareilly Zone Co-ordinator of the party's unit. In 2008 at the age of 32 he became the vice-president of the state construction corporation (status of MoS UP Government).In 2012 he contested from Powayan constituency on BSP ticket and lost to SP"s candisate Shakuntla Devi by the margin of 4.2 percentage of votes. On 15 June 2015, he was fired by his party for anti-party activities.

After leaving Bahujan Samaj Party, Sagar immediately joined the Bharatiya Janata Party. The party recruited him as they were lacking a Dalit leader and was searching for one. In 2015, he was made the vice-president of the party's Braj region unit.

In March 2019, Bharatiya Janata Party announced that Sagar would contest the upcoming general election from the Shahjahanpur Lok Sabha constituency. He replaced sitting MP and union minister Krishna Raj. On 23 May, he was elected to the Lok Sabha, after defeating Amar Chand Jauhar of Mahagathbandhan, his nearest rival by a margin of 268,418 votes. Which was biggest margin in Rohilkhand. Sagar was polled 688,990 votes.

References

External links
MyNeta profile

Lok Sabha members from Uttar Pradesh
Living people
Bharatiya Janata Party politicians from Uttar Pradesh
India MPs 2019–present
Year of birth missing (living people)
People from Shahjahanpur